Taborton is a hamlet located within the town of Sand Lake in Rensselaer County, New York, United States. It is served by the Taborton Fire Department. Two large ponds, Big Bowman Pond and Little Bowman Pond, are in the immediate vicinity.

References

Hamlets in Rensselaer County, New York